Emiliano Adrián Insúa Zapata (born 7 January 1989) is an Argentine professional footballer who plays as a left-back for Racing Club.

Insúa is a citizen of the European Union through one of his grandparents, who is Spanish.

Career

Early career
Insúa began his football career with youth team Pinocho in Villa Urquiza, Argentina, later moving to, Buenos Aires-based team, Boca Juniors. The left back did not break into the first-team at La Bombonera when he caught the attention of scouts Frank McParland and Paddy Murphy from Liverpool. After some solid performances for the Argentinian U17s, many clubs were desperate to sign him, a player who rarely had appearances for his then club, and Boca were also very keen to get a profit from this young prodigy which led to negotiations between Liverpool and Boca. The defender agreed to an 18-month loan deal with the Merseyside club on 28 November 2006, beginning his loan period in January.

Liverpool
Insúa made his first-team debut against Portsmouth on 28 April 2007, but made only one more league appearance that season. His loan deal was made permanent in August 2007 in the deal which saw Gabriel Paletta move to Boca Juniors.

The following season Insúa made only three more first-team league appearances but found success with Gary Ablett's Premier Reserve League winning team; along with other Liverpool youngsters. His performances impressed manager Rafael Benítez enough to offer him a new three-year deal at the club. In December 2008 Insua got a run of games in the Liverpool first team, due to an injury to Fábio Aurélio and also due to the form of Andrea Dossena. Insúa found himself starting in Liverpool's opening six Premier League games and the first tie of their UEFA Champions League campaign. He scored his first goal for the club in a Football League Cup match against Arsenal at the Emirates Stadium on 28 October 2009.

In July 2010, despite being Liverpool's only senior left back available, a fee was agreed for him to join Fiorentina, although a contract was never signed.

Loan to Galatasaray
On 31 August 2010, he joined Galatasaray on a one-year loan deal with an option to transfer permanently next year on 30 June, when the deal expired. He wore the number 6 shirt. It was rumoured that Insúa would be returning to Liverpool in the January transfer window after Galatasaray manager Gheorghe Hagi stated that he did not want loan players in his squad and Insúa had reportedly expressed his desire to play for Liverpool under new manager Kenny Dalglish.

Return to Liverpool

Insúa returned to Liverpool for pre-season training following his loan spell. After being denied entry into China for passport reasons, Insua rejoined the Liverpool squad in Malaysia. He featured in Liverpool's 6–3 win over a Malaysian select team, coming on as a second-half substitute and scoring a goal.

Sporting CP
On 27 August 2011, Sporting CP announced that Insúa had signed for the club in a five-year deal for an undisclosed fee. He was given the number 48.

Insúa made his debut for Sporting on 15 September 2011 in the UEFA Europa League, scoring the first goal in a 2–0 victory over FC Zurich. On 29 September 2011, Insúa scored the second goal in a 2–1 victory against SS Lazio, again in the Europa League. He was sent off later in the match after earning a second yellow card.

Atlético Madrid
On 25 January 2013, Atlético Madrid announced that they have reached an agreement with Sporting Clube de Portugal for the transfer of Insúa, reportedly for €3.5 million.

Loan to Rayo Vallecano 
On 1 September 2014 Insúa was loaned to fellow league team Rayo Vallecano, in a season-long deal.

VfB Stuttgart
On 11 July 2015 Insúa mutually terminated his contract with Atlético and signed with VfB Stuttgart until 2018. Insúa extended his contract with Stuttgart on 14 May 2018 until June 2020.

LA Galaxy
On 2 January 2020, Insúa signed with MLS side LA Galaxy.

Aldosivi
On 14 February 2021, Insúa agreed his return to Argentina after nearly 14 years abroad, joining Aldosivi in the Primera División on a free transfer and a deal running until December. Two days later, he was joined by his brother Emanuel, becoming teammates for the first time in their professional careers.

International career
The player succeeded on the Under-20s international scene, playing three games to finish with the runner-up medal at the 2007 South American Youth Championship, which served as a qualifier for the FIFA U20 World Cup where he played seven games, conceding just 4 goals in the entire tournament and aiding the Argentina Under-20 team to victory against the Czech Republic in the FIFA U20 World Cup final on 22 July 2007.

On 24 August 2009, Liverpool manager Rafael Benítez said that Diego Maradona was monitoring the progress of Insúa and considering calling him up for international duty with Argentina. Maradona eventually did call him up on 26 September 2009, for the crucial World Cup qualifiers against Peru and Uruguay, making his first start in a 2–1 win over Peru.

Career statistics

Club

International

Honours
Liverpool
Premier Reserve League: 2008

Atlético Madrid
La Liga: 2013–14
Copa del Rey: 2012–13
Supercopa de España: 2014
UEFA Champions League: runner-up 2013–14

VfB Stuttgart
2. Bundesliga: 2016–17

Argentina
FIFA U-20 World Cup: 2007

Personal life
Insúa's younger brother, Emanuel, is also a footballer and left back.

References

External links

 LFCHistory.net Profile
 
 
 

1989 births
Living people
Footballers from Buenos Aires
Argentine footballers
Association football defenders
Argentina international footballers
Argentina under-20 international footballers
Boca Juniors footballers
Liverpool F.C. players
Galatasaray S.K. footballers
Sporting CP footballers
Atlético Madrid footballers
Rayo Vallecano players
VfB Stuttgart players
LA Galaxy players
Aldosivi footballers
Racing Club de Avellaneda footballers
Argentine Primera División players
Premier League players
Süper Lig players
La Liga players
Bundesliga players
2. Bundesliga players
Major League Soccer players
Argentine expatriate footballers
Expatriate footballers in England
Expatriate footballers in Turkey
Expatriate footballers in Portugal
Expatriate footballers in Spain
Expatriate footballers in Germany
Expatriate soccer players in the United States
Argentine expatriate sportspeople in England
Argentine expatriate sportspeople in Turkey
Argentine expatriate sportspeople in Portugal
Argentine expatriate sportspeople in Spain
Argentine expatriate sportspeople in Germany
Argentine expatriate sportspeople in the United States
Argentine emigrants to Spain
Argentine sportspeople of Spanish descent
Citizens of Spain through descent